The UEFA Club Footballer of the Year was a football award presented by UEFA to the most outstanding performers of every European club football season. The award, along with "Best Goalkeeper," "Best Defender," "Best Midfielder," and "Best Forward," was given at the end of each season at a special gala in Monaco prior to the UEFA Super Cup. The honour had been bestowed upon first-class European football stars since the 1997–98 season, when it was awarded to Ronaldo, then of Internazionale. Since the 2010–11 season, it has been replaced by the UEFA Men's Player of the Year Award.

Winners

Below is a list of all the recipients of the award:

By country

By club

See also
UEFA Men's Player of the Year Award
UEFA Club Football Awards
UEFA Team of the Year

External links
UEFA Club Footballer of the Year

Club Footballer of the Year
Association football player of the year awards